Charles Walter Simpson  (1878–1942) was a Canadian artist and illustrator.

Life and work
Simpson was born in Montreal, Quebec on 16 April 1878 He died in Montreal on 16 September 1942.

Beginning in January 1918, he served with Canadian forces in the First World War. Simpson was one of the first group of "official war artists"—Lord Beaverbrook arranged for Simpson, along with Frederick Varley, J.W. Beatty and Maurice Cullen to be sent overseas to record Canada's participation in the conflict.

Simpson was a member of the Royal Canadian Academy of Arts. His diploma submission, Indian Summer, Montreal Harbour was deposited in the collection of the National Gallery of Canada in 1921.

Simpson worked as an illustrator, creating images for books commissioned by various firms to promote their industries or commemorate their achievements. Legends of the St. Lawrence(1926) by Katherine Hale was commissioned by the Canadian Pacific Railway Company to be used as a luxury gift for children who were travelling on the company's around the world tours.

Selected works
Simpson's published works encompass 43 works in 48 publications in 2 languages and 128 library holdings.

 1940 — The Mechanics' Institute of Montreal: One Hundredth Anniversary 1840-1940
 1936 — Canadian Pacific Rockies by Betty Thornley
 1936 — From Rags to Writing Paper: a Series of Twelve Sketches by Charles W Simpson
 1933 — Canadian Cities of Romance by Katherine Hale
 1932 — August Sixth, Nineteen Thirty Two, the Opening of the Welland Ship Canal: a Canadian Conception, a Canadian Achievement by Canada
 1929 — Croquis montréalais by Victor Morin (English title: Old Montreal with Pen and Pencil)
 1927 — Le Conseil de Québec de 1769 
 1926 — Legends of the St. Lawrence by Katherine Hale
 1925 — Légendes du Saint-Laurent by Amelia Beers (Warnock) Garvin
 1919 — Cotton by Dominion Textile Company Limited, Montreal

Gallery

See also

 Canadian official war artists
 War artist
 War art

Notes

References 
 Davis, Ann (1992). The Logic of Ecstasy: Canadian Mystical Painting, 1920–1940. Toronto: University of Toronto Press. ; ; OCLC 26256269

Further reading
 National Gallery of Canada, Library. (1977). Charles Walter Simpson: documentation file by National Gallery of Canada.  Ottawa: National Gallery of Canada. OCLC 071763310

External links
 Canadian Pacific archives:  "Departure time" (BR102),  "Empress route" (BR103)

1878 births
1942 deaths
19th-century Canadian painters
Canadian male painters
20th-century Canadian painters
Artists from Montreal
Canadian war artists
Members of the Royal Canadian Academy of Arts
World War I artists
19th-century Canadian male artists
20th-century Canadian male artists